Typhonium mirabile is a species of flowering plant in the family Araceae. It is found growing in Australia in eucalypts woodlands at the base of Cycas plants. It was first described in 1992 by Alistair Hay, as Lazarum mirabile and was the only species in the genus Lazarum. In 1997, Hay published a paper transferring it to the genus Typhonium.

References

mirabile
Monocots of Australia
Plants described in 1992
Flora of the Northern Territory
Taxa named by Alistair Hay